Robert Raymond (1922–2003) was an Australian producer, director and writer.

Robert Raymond may also refer to:

 Robert Raymond (cyclist) (born 1930), Belgian cyclist
 Robert Raymond, 1st Baron Raymond (1673–1733), British judge
 Bobby Raymond (born 1985), Canadian ice hockey defenceman